Abraham Kahana (19 December 1874 – 20 February 1946) was a Russian-born Biblical scholar, biographer, historian, translator, and librarian.

Biography
Though he received a traditional Jewish education, he was largely self-educated. He was appointed professor at the University of Kiev following the October Revolution, before emigrating to Warsaw with his family in 1922, and the following year to Mandatory Palestine, which he had first visited in 1914.

He focused especially on the editing, annotation, and translation into Hebrew of Jewish apocrypha, publishing these texts through his publishing house Mekorot. He was awarded the Bialik Prize eight years later for these efforts. 

He died in 1946, and is buried alongside his wife at Trumpeldor Cemetery. His personal library was bequeathed to the Hebrew University of Jerusalem, while his correspondences are held at the National Library of Israel.

Work
Abraham Kahana's interests were wide and varied, from biblical exegesis to linguistics and the history of Hasidism. Some of his earlier works include an anthology of S. D. Luzzatto's letters, translated from the Italian into Hebrew (Odessa, 1896); Devar Shmuel (Kraków, 1896), a collection of letters from Samuel Vita Lolli to Luzzatto and I. S. Reggio, with the replies of Reggio and a biography of Lolli by Castiglioni; a Hebrew biography of Moses Ḥayyim Luzzatto (Warsaw, 1898); Korot ha-Yehudim be-Roma (Warsaw, 1901); Dikduk lashon Ivrit, after Luzzatto's Hebrew grammar (Warsaw, 1901); and Rabbi Yisrael Ba'al Shem-Tov (Zhytomyr, 1901).

From 1903, he was the editor of a critical commentary, in Hebrew, on the Tanakh, to which he contributed commentaries and introductions to Genesis, Exodus, Numbers, Job, Proverbs, Ecclesiastes, and Ezra–Nehemiah. He published the first edition of his bilingual Russian-Hebrew dictionary in 1907, and a study of Rashi's commentaries a year later. His Sefer Ha-hassidut, a collection of biographies, teachings and anecdotes, was published in Warsaw in 1922.

Kahana was also a frequent contributor to the Hebrew periodicals Ha-Melitz, Ha-Zman, and Ha-Shiloaḥ, and was the editor of the literary reviews in Ha-Dor.

References

External links
 Works by Abraham Kahana at the Online Books Page

1874 births
1946 deaths
19th-century biographers
19th-century Jewish biblical scholars
20th-century biographers
20th-century Jewish biblical scholars
20th-century lexicographers
Hebrew-language writers
Israeli biblical scholars
Israeli lexicographers
Israeli librarians
Jews in Mandatory Palestine
Male biographers
Russian biblical scholars
Russian biographers
Russian Jews
Russian lexicographers
Russian librarians
Soviet emigrants to Mandatory Palestine
Academic staff of the Taras Shevchenko National University of Kyiv
Translators from Greek
Translators to Hebrew